Kosmos 455 ( meaning Cosmos 455), known before launch as DS-P1-Yu No.54, was a Soviet satellite which was launched in 1971 as part of the Dnepropetrovsk Sputnik programme. It was a  spacecraft, which was built by the Yuzhnoye Design Bureau, and was used as a radar calibration target for anti-ballistic missile tests.

Launch 
Kosmos 455 was successfully launched into low Earth orbit on 17 November 1971, with the rocket lifting off at 11:09:48 UTC. The launch took place from Site 133/1 at the Plesetsk Cosmodrome, and used a Kosmos-2I 63SM carrier rocket.

Orbit 
Upon reaching orbit, it was assigned its Kosmos designation, and received the International Designator 1971-097A.

Kosmos 455 was the forty-seventh of seventy nine DS-P1-Yu satellites to be launched, and the forty-second of seventy two to successfully reach orbit. It remained in orbit until it decayed and reentered the atmosphere on 9 April 1972.

See also

 1971 in spaceflight

References

1971 in spaceflight
Kosmos satellites
Spacecraft launched in 1971
Dnepropetrovsk Sputnik program